Helen Sedgwick is an author of literary fiction, science fiction and crime, a literary editor, and a research physicist.

Life 

Sedgwick was born in London and studied physics at Bristol University. She gained a PhD in Physics from Edinburgh University and she has an MLitt in Creative Writing from Glasgow University.

After leaving physics research to become a freelance writer, Sedgwick worked as the joint managing director of Cargo Publishing from 2014 to 2015, Sedgwick was also the managing editor of Gutter magazine and worked as a creative writing tutor.

She released her first novel in 2016, The Comet Seekers. This was followed by her second novel, The Growing Season, which was shortlisted for Fiction Book of the Year in Scotland's National Book Awards 2018. Sedgwick's first crime novel was When The Dead Come Calling, the opening book in the Burrowhead Mysteries crime trilogy. She cites her scientific background as a big influence on her writing.

Sedgwick is a member of The Society of Authors and the Crime Writers' Association. She lives in Tain, in Ross-shire in the Scottish Highlands with her partner and their daughter.

Awards 

2012 Scottish Book Trust New Writers Award.
2016 Glamour Book of the Year: The Comet Seekers.
2016 Waterstones Scottish Book of the Month: The Comet Seekers.
2018 Scotland's National Book Awards Fiction Book of the Year shortlist: The Growing Season.
2021 Dr Gavin Wallace Fellowship.

Bibliography

Novels 

 The Comet Seekers (2016)
 The Growing Season (2017)
 When the Dead Come Calling (2020)
 Where the Missing Gather (2021)
 What Doesn't Break Us (2022)

Short stories  

 The Archaeologist of Akrotiri, New Writing Scotland 35 (2017)
 The Largest Circle, 404 INK Issue 1 (2016)
 Quantum Gravity Or: The Pigmy Marmoset and the Prefabricated Concrete Bungalow, I Am Because You Are (2015)
 Duality, Out there (2014)
 Precognitive Abilities, Songs of Other Places, New Writing Scotland 32 (2014)

References 

21st-century British novelists
Alumni of the University of Bristol
Alumni of the University of Edinburgh
Alumni of the University of Glasgow